French Bar Canyon is a canyon on the Fraser River in British Columbia, Canada, near Big Bar and Jesmond, and approximately 60 km upstream from Lillooet.

The canyon is also the site of a June 2019 landslide that blocked the passage of spawning salmon.

See also
Fraser Canyon
List of natural features on the Fraser River

References

BCGNIS listing "French Bar Canyon (canyon)" 

Canyons and gorges of British Columbia
Landforms of the Cariboo
Lillooet Country
Fraser Canyon